Terminus Centre-Ville is a bus terminus located within 1000 de La Gauchetière in Montreal, Quebec, Canada. It is multimodal with the Bonaventure Metro station and Lucien-L'Allier Metro station on the Orange Line, and the Central Station in the city's downtown core. The terminus has 21 gates in three areas.  Terminus Mansfield is an overflow facility built directly next to the site.

North platform
The north platform has twelve gates (1–12) and is used exclusively by rush-hour-only RTL buses.  It is open during morning and evening rush hour (Monday to Friday 05:15 to 09:30 and 15:00 to 19:00).

Centre platform
The centre platform has three gates (19–21) and is used by two high frequency routes: RTL 45 and 90. The centre platform also has two elevators, both installed in 2019, one connecting to the Bonaventure metro station, the other to an above-ground exit.

South platform
The south platform has five gates (13–18) and is used by RTM Roussillon (Gate 13), RTM Le Richelain (Gate 14–15), RTM Chambly-Richelieu-Carignan (Gate 16–17) and RTM Saint-Jean-sur-Richelieu (Gate 17–18).

Outside Waiting Areas 
Certain transit authorities have been moved to a series of bus stops outside Place Bonaventure, while others have been moved to a loop route along René Lévesque Boulevard.

Connecting bus routes

References

External links

 CIT Chambly-Richelieu-Carignan
 CIT de la Vallée du Richelieu

 CIT le Richelain
 CIT Roussillon
 CIT du Sud Ouest
 CIT Haut Saint Laurent

Exo bus stations
Downtown Montreal